is a city in southern Hyōgo Prefecture, Japan. , the city had an estimated population of 304,274 in 135,323 households and a population density of 6,200 people per km².

Geography 
Akashi located in southern Hyōgo prefecture, and is a long and narrow municipality along the Seto Inland Sea. It is separated from Awaji Island by Harima Bay; however, the terminus of the Akashi Kaikyō Bridge, which connects Honshu to Awaji Island and to Shikoku, is not in Akashi but in Tarumi-ku, Kōbe.  The 135th meridian east line that determines Japan Standard Time passes though the city.

Neighbouring municipalities 
Hyōgo Prefecture
 Kōbe
 Kakogawa
 Harima
 Inami

Climate
Akashi has a humid subtropical climate (Köppen climate classification Cfa) with hot summers and cool to cold winters. Precipitation is significantly higher in summer than in winter, though on the whole lower than in most parts of Honshū, and there is no significant snowfall.

Demographics

History
Akashi is mentioned in a waka (five-line, 31-syllable poem) written by Kakinomoto no Hitomaro in the 7th century and it is the setting for one of the chapters of the 11th-century novel The Tale of Genji. It developed as the castle town of Akashi Domain during the Edo Period, from 1617 to 1871 due to its  location dominating the San'yōdō highway connecting the Kinai region with western Japan. The famous swordsman Miyamoto Musashi is claimed to have laid out the design of the castle town. The town of Akashi was established on April 1, 1889 with the creation of the modern municipalities system. It was raised to city status on November 1, 1919. The city annexed the neighboring villages of Hayashizaki on February 11, 1942 and Okubo, Uozumi and Futami on January 10, 1951 to reach its present dimensions. A proposal to merge with the city of Kobe was rejected by a referendum in 1955. The city suffered from  the Great Hanshin earthquake of 1995 with 4,839 houses were completely or partially destroyed and nine fatalities.

On July 21, 2001, 11 people were killed and 247 were injured during a stampede after a fireworks show. Five city officials were subsequently convicted of negligence in connection with the incident.

Akashi became a  Core city on April 1, 2018 with increased local autonomy.

Government
Akashi has a mayor-council form of government with a directly elected mayor and a unicameral city council of 30 members. Akashi contributes four members to the Hyogo Prefectural Assembly. In terms of national politics, the city is part of Hyōgo 9th district of the lower house of the Diet of Japan.  Akashi is governed by Mayor Fusaho Izumi, an independent.

Economy
Akashi is located within the Hanshin Industrial Area and Harima Seaside Industrial Area and has succeeded in attracting many companies to its Futami Seaside Industrial Park. the city has long been noted for aviation-related instrumentation manufacturers and electronic component manufacturers. Yamato Scale, a leading global manufacturer of commercial weighing and packaging equipment, is headquartered in the city. Due to its transportation connections and location, numerous bedroom communities have developed for commuters to Kobe and Osaka, which is estimated to exceed 30% of the working population. The city has also been noted since the Edo Period for its production of sake.

Education
Akashi has 28 public elementary schools, 13 public middle schools and one public high school operated by the city government and seven public high schools operated by the Hyōgo Prefectural Department of Education. There is also one national elementary school. The city also operates one special education school for the handicapped. The nursing school of University of Hyogo is located in Akashi.

The city also has the National Institute of Technology Akashi College (NITAC)．

The city once had a North Korean school,  and Akashi Junior College.

Transportation

Railway 
 JR West – San'yō Shinkansen
 
 JR West – San'yō Main Line (JR Kobe Line)
  -  -  -  - 
 Sanyo Electric Railway - Main Line
  -  -  -  -  -  -  -  -  -  -  -

Highways 
  Daini-Shinmei Road
  (Kobe, Okayama, Hiroshima, Shimonoseki)
  (Kobe, Tokushima)
  (Maizuru)
  (Kobe, Okayama)
  (Maizuru)
  (Nishiwaki, Asago)

Ferries
 Akashi Awaji Ferry and Awaji Jenova Line to Awaji Island

International relations

Twin towns – Sister/friendship cities
Akashi is twinned with:
  Vallejo, California, USA, sister city since 1968
 Wuxi, China, friendship city since 1981

Local attractions
 Akashi Castle, National Historic Site
 Akashi Municipal Planetarium, which stands on the meridian of 135 degrees east longitude, which is used to determine Japan Standard Time. 
 Akashi Park Stadium is a track and field stadium that can hold 20,000 spectators.
Kakinomoto Shrine
Uonotana (Uo-no-Tana, literally "fish-shelf"), a market where local fishermen display an array of fresh seafood caught in the Akashi Strait.

Culture
Akashi is known for Akashiyaki, a kind of takoyaki particular to the region. Small pieces of octopus (tako) are placed inside a ball-shaped mold containing a mixture of flour and eggs, and this is then fried. Akashiyaki is often eaten by dipping in a thin soup.

Noted people from Akashi
 Yumi Kokamo, long-distance runner
Mami Kingetsu, voice actress
Airi Taira, actress

References

External links

Akashi City official website

 
Cities in Hyōgo Prefecture
Populated coastal places in Japan
Port settlements in Japan